Mixed martial arts is the second most popular sport in Brazil.

History

One of the early innovation in mixed martial arts was a fight between Masahiko Kimura vs. Hélio Gracie.

The precursor for MMA was Vale Tudo.

The Brazilian MMA Athletic Commission, or Comissao Atletica Brasileira de MMA (CABMMA), represents state federations across Brazil and is spearheaded by lawyers Giovanni Biscardi and Rafael Favettia, a former Executive Secretary of the Minister of Justice and Interim Minister of Justice.

Organizations

The UFC is the most widely watched MMA organization and is broadcast on Globo. Jungle Fight is a popular domestic Brazilian MMA organization.

References